The 1927 Bulgarian State Football Championship was not held, and thus there was no winner.

Following the bitter dispute from last season, that dragged on well into the spring of 1927, Slavia Sofia, which won Sofiyska OSO, refused to enter the championship. Furthermore, only three other OSO winners were determined before the allotted deadline for participation in the State championship. Those were Vladislav Varna from Varnenska OSO, Levski Ruse from Rusenska OSO and Levski Plovdiv from Plovdivska OSO. Because of this the championship for this season had to be cancelled.

References
Bulgaria - List of final tables (RSSSF)

Bulgarian State Football Championship seasons
Bul
1